Macrocalcara sporima is a moth of the family Gelechiidae. It was described by Anthonie Johannes Theodorus Janse in 1960. It is found in Namibia.

References

Moths described in 1960
Apatetrinae